Leegin Creative Leather Products, Inc. v. PSKS, Inc., 551 U.S. 877 (2007), is a US antitrust case in which the United States Supreme Court overruled Dr. Miles Medical Co. v. John D. Park & Sons Co. Dr Miles had ruled that vertical price restraints were illegal per se under Section 1 of the Sherman Antitrust Act. Leegin established that the legality of such restraints are to be judged based on the rule of reason.

Facts
Leegin, a manufacturer of leather apparel, concluded that its interests would be best served by opting out of a price war "race to the bottom," focusing instead on quality and brand cachet. Accordingly, with specific exceptions, it decided to refuse sale to retailers if they intended to discount its products below their recommended retail price. Five years after this policy was introduced, Leegin discovered that Kay's Kloset was violating the policy by marking down the Leegin products by 20%. When Kay's refused to comply with Leegin's policy, Leegin cut them off. PSKS, the parent company of Kay's, sued charging that Leegin had violated antitrust laws when it entered into "agreements with retailers to charge only those prices fixed by Leegin." After the district court refused to hear testimony describing the procompetitive effects of Leegin's pricing policy, Leegin appealed seeking to have Dr. Miles overruled.

Judgment
Dr. Miles had become obsolete almost as soon as it was decided; the court started moving away from rigid per se rules in antitrust, both generally, see Standard Oil v. United States (decided only a month after Dr. Miles), and in the particular area of vertical restraints, see United States v. Colgate & Co. (1919). After a brief mid-century hiatus in which the court imposed a more social goals-oriented jurisprudence, the court tacked back to an understanding of antitrust based on economics and allocative efficiency, primarily under the influence of Robert Bork's book The Antitrust Paradox. As this process rolled through cases like Continental Television, Inc. v. GTE Sylvania, Inc. (1977), State Oil Co. v. Khan (1997), and Verizon Communications Inc. v. Law Offices of Curtis V. Trinko, LLP (2004), Dr. Miles became more and more anomalous.

In Leegin, the court resolved the tension by overruling Dr. Miles. Citing Bork, Ronald Coase, and others, the Court held that manufacturer-imposed minimum resale prices can lead retailers to compete efficiently for customer sales in ways other than cutting the retail price.

See also
 List of United States Supreme Court cases, volume 551
 List of United States Supreme Court cases
 United States v. Apple Inc. (S.D.N.Y., 2013)

References

Further reading

External links
 
Oral Argument, March 26, 2007 (Transcript)
Brief for Petitioner Leegin Creative Leather Products, Inc.
Brief for Respondent PSK Inc. D/B/A Kay's Kloset, Kay's Shoes
Reply Brief for Petitioner Leegin Creative Leather Products, Inc.

United States Supreme Court decisions that overrule a prior Supreme Court decision
United States Supreme Court cases
United States antitrust case law
2007 in United States case law
Leather clothing
United States Supreme Court cases of the Roberts Court